The second USS Chipper (SP-1049), was a United States Navy patrol vessel and ferryboat in commission from 1917 to 1919.

Chipper was built as a civilian motorboat of the same name in 1909 at Morris Heights in the Bronx, New York. The U.S. Navy leased her on 21 July 1917 for World War I service as a patrol vessel. She was commissioned as USS Chipper (SP-1049) on 24 July 1917.

Attached to the 4th Naval District, Chipper initially performed section patrol duty at Philadelphia, Pennsylvania, then was employed on ferry duties at the United States Naval Academy in Annapolis, Maryland. In March 1918 she was transferred to the 5th Naval District, and in August 1918 was reported to be serving at Naval Air Station Anacostia in Washington, D.C.

Chipper was returned to her owner on 24 March 1919.

Chipper should not be confused with another patrol vessel, USS Chipper (SP-256), later USS SP-256, which also was in commission in the U.S. Navy during World War I.

References

Department of the Navy: Navy History and Heritage Command: Online Library of Selected Images: Civilian Ships: Chipper (American Motor Boat, 1909). Served as USS Chipper (SP-1049) in 1917-1919
NavSource Online: Section Patrol Craft Photo Archive: Chipper (SP 1049)

Patrol vessels of the United States Navy
World War I patrol vessels of the United States
World War I auxiliary ships of the United States
Ships built in Morris Heights, Bronx
1909 ships